The Standard Bank International Series was the name of the One Day International cricket tournament in South Africa for the 1997-98 season. It was a tri-nation series between South Africa, Pakistan and Sri Lanka.

South Africa booked a slot into the Final through winning five matches out of the six they played. The slot for the second finalist was decided in the last league match between South Africa and Sri Lanka. Sri Lanka had to beat South Africa to qualify. When they were beaten, Pakistan and Sri Lanka tied on points. Pakistan qualified for the Final by having a better head-to-head record against Sri Lanka, having won two and lost one of the matches between the two teams.

South Africa beat Pakistan in the Final to win the series.

Arjuna Ranatunga of Sri Lanka emerged as the top run-scorer with 272 runs, with an average of 54.40; Jacques Kallis of South Africa followed close behind with 267 runs. Wasim Akram of Pakistan finished the series as top wicket-taker capturing 15 wickets, with Muttiah Muralitharan of Sri Lanka taking 14. Jonty Rhodes was named "man of the series".

Squads

Nuwan Zoysa joined the Sri Lankan party on 25 March to replace Chaminda Vaas who suffered a right ankle injury in the 1st Test. However, Zoysa twisted a knee so Vaas was reckoned to be fit enough to play in the one-day series.

Points table

Group stage matches

1st match

2nd match

3rd match

4th match

5th match

6th match

7th match

8th match

9th match

Final

References

External links
 Tournament home at ESPN Cricinfo
 Standard Bank International One-day Series in South Africa, Apr 1998 at ESPNcricinfo archive
 
 

1998 in South African cricket
International cricket competitions from 1997–98 to 2000
Cricket